Amir El-Falaki (born 12 August 1973) is a Danish vocalist, dance instructor, and member of the bubblegum dance group Toy-Box. He is of Moroccan descent and speaks Danish, English, Arabic, and French.

Amir wanted to be a doctor, but became a dance teacher instead. He met Anila Mirza at a New Year's Eve party and they decided to form Toy-Box. The group is known for songs such as "Best Friend" and "Tarzan & Jane".

Career outside of Toy-Box 
Amir has worked as a dance teacher, music video choreographer, and trainer to F.C. Copenhagen's cheerleading team.

Amir performed a rap and danced in Julie Lund's song, Merhaba, at the Danish national Eurovision semi-final, Melodi Grand Prix 2007. However, their song came last (out of eight) in the Semi-Final 2, and was subsequently eliminated in the Wildcard round with 11% of the vote, and so did not progress into the national final.

In 2009, Amir founded the award-winning Danseplaneten dance studio in Hellerup, Copenhagen.

References

External links
 Amir El-Falaki
 

1973 births
Living people
Danish people of Moroccan descent
English-language singers from Denmark
Danish male dancers
21st-century Danish  male singers